Clostridium phytofermentans  (also called Lachnoclostridium phytofermentans) is an obligately anaerobic rod-shaped spore-forming, Gram-positive bacterium in the family Lachnospiraceae. It is a model organism of interest for its ability to ferment diverse plant polysaccharides  including cellulose, hemicellulose, and pectin to ethanol, acetate, and hydrogen. The C. phytofermentans 4.8 Mb genome has been fully sequenced, revealing it contains over 170 enzymes in the CAZy database, though one hydrolase appears to be essential for degrading cellulose.

References

External links
 Type strain of Clostridium phytofermentans at BacDive -  the Bacterial Diversity Metadatabase

Gram-positive bacteria
Medically important anaerobes
Bacteria described in 2002
phytofermentans